Paros National Airport  is the airport serving the island of Paros, Greece, in the Cyclades islands region. It replaced the Old Paros National Airport on 25 July 2016.

History
The old airport of Paros, which was situated a few kilometers to the south, was operational since 1982. Its 710-meter runway was sufficient for its time, but over years, passenger numbers grew making the use of larger aircraft necessary. Although these aircraft could serve various Greek airports, Paros airport was not one of them. The reason was that it had a short runway. It was finally decided that there should be a new airport for the island. The new airport opened in 2016 taking over all operations of the old airport. It has a wider, 1,400 meter runway and larger aircraft can use it. The types that fly to the airport currently are the following: Bombardier Dash 8 Q400 of Olympic Air, ATR 42/72 of Sky Express (Greece), BAe 146 & ATR 42/72 of Astra Airlines and B737-700 of Travel Service.

Since 8 June 2018, Smartwings, a Czech charter airline, is the first operator to regularly fly with a medium-sized jet to Paros. The flight is operated with a fuel stop at Santorini Airport on the return leg, due to no fuel being available at Paros.

Olympic Air, a subsidiary of Aegean Airlines, financed both the construction of the first phase of the terminal and the infrastructure works for the new airport.

On November 11, 2020, it was announced that funding of over €43m was guaranteed to complete the airport and serve international destinations. Works will include a new terminal of 12.000m2, an extended runway of 1799m, a new control tower and other facilities. Works will start in June 2021 and are scheduled to be completed by the end of 2023.

Airlines and destinations
The following airlines operate regular scheduled and charter flights at Paros Airport:

Statistics

Ground transportation
Other than car, the airport is linked to the city of Parikia by bus from the nearby bus station. There are also taxis available to any destination on the island.

See also
Transport in Greece

References

External links
Hellenic Civil Aviation Authority – Paros Airport
Greek Airports Guide – Paros Airport
Greek Airports – Paros National Airport

Airports in Greece
Buildings and structures in Paros
2016 establishments in Greece
Airports established in 2016